The 2003 Huntingdonshire District Council election took place on 1 May 2003 to elect members of Huntingdonshire District Council in Cambridgeshire, England. One third of the council was up for election and the Conservative Party stayed in overall control of the council.

After the election, the composition of the council was:
 Conservative 36
 Liberal Democrats 14
 Independent 3

Election result

Ward results

References

2003 English local elections
2003
2000s in Cambridgeshire